LV-ROM is an optical disc format developed by Philips Electronics to integrate analog video and computer software for interactive multimedia. The LV-ROM is a specialized variation of the CAV Laserdisc. LV-ROM is an initialism for "LaserVision Read-Only Memory".

Like Laserdisc, LV-ROM discs store analog audio and video by encoding it in pulse-width modulation. However, LV-ROM also stores computer files via the Advanced Disc Filing System, which is the file system used by Acorn Computers. An LV-ROM disc can store up to 324 megabytes of digital information, or up to 54,000 frames of analog video (36 minutes with a frame rate of 25 fps) per side.

The format had only one application: to publish documentary video, children's writings, and other historical records compiled from 1984 to 1986 for the BBC Domesday Project. The Domesday Project LV-ROM discs were played using a BBC Master computer connected via SCSI-1 to a Philips AIV VP415 Laserdisc player. A genlock enabled the software stored on the LV-ROM to display computer graphics over the analog video on the BBC Master's computer screen. The buttons and menus of the user interface were accessed with a trackball.

LD-ROM
In the early 1990s, Pioneer Corporation deployed a variation of the 30-cm LV-ROM with a different file system and a 540 megabyte capacity. This disc format, called LD-ROM, stored the software for a home entertainment system that Pioneer introduced in 1993. This system, the Pioneer LaserActive, was a cross-platform video game console, Laserdisc player, and CD player.

LD-ROMs owe their greater capacity to a design for constant linear velocity (CLV) playback. Like magnetic tape, the playback speed corresponds with picture quality and audio definition of analog audio-video streams. Since Pioneer intended LD-ROMs primarily for computer software, they chose CLV technology to increase the file storage capacity.

Specialized LD-ROM discs include the MEGA LD (for Sega Mega CD/Sega CD software), the LD-G (for karaoke data or digital photo albums; similar to CD+G), and the LD-ROM² (for PC-Engine CD-ROM² software). Such software was published either on 30-centimeter discs or on 20-centimeter discs with a lesser storage capacity.

Whereas LV-ROM is an abbreviation of "LaserVision Read-Only Memory", LD-ROM is an abbreviation of "LaserDisc Read-Only Memory".

References

See also

Rotating disc computer storage media
LaserDisc
Pioneer Corporation products
Products introduced in 1986
Video storage